Po Kong Village Road Park is a sports ground located in Diamond Hill, Hong Kong. The footprint of the park covers 9 hectares and contains various amenities including football pitches, a 1 km cycling track, an amphitheatre and a car park.

The park is open 24 hours a day.

Football
The two pitches inside the park are frequently rented by various Hong Kong football clubs representing various levels of the Hong Kong pyramid. A 1,000 seat grandstand is located on the west side of the pitches with men's and ladies' change rooms and toilets within. The stand is open daily from 7:30 a.m. to 10:00 p.m.

Facilities
 Two 11 a side football/rugby pitches
 Two cricket field nets
 650m jogging track
 Two cycling areas (one elevated track, one beginner's park)
 Skate park
 Two fitness stations
 Two elderly fitness corners
 Children's playground
 Renewable energy zone
 45 car park

Gallery

See also
 San Po Kong

References

External links

Diamond Hill
Sports venues in Hong Kong
Football venues in Hong Kong